Robert B. "Bob" Long is an American politician from Maryland from the Republican party. He is currently serving as member of the Maryland House of Delegates from District 6, representing Southeast Baltimore County.

Early life and career
Long was born in Baltimore, Maryland on January 11, 1957. He attended Essex Community College and the Community College of Baltimore County before becoming a GRI-designated realtor for Covenant Realty. He is also a former union truck driver.

Long is a member of the Maryland Association of Realtors, the Greater Baltimore Board of Realtors, the Henrietta Lacks Legacy Group, and the National Rifle Association.

With his wife Rose, Long has four children.

In the legislature
Long has been a member of the Maryland House of Delegates since January 14, 2015. He won alongside two other Republicans, Ric Metzgar and Robin Grammer Jr., succeeding delegate Joseph J. Minnick, who announced in August 2013 that he would retire at the end of his term.

Committee assignments
 Ways and Means Committee, 2015–present (election law subcommittee, 2015–2017, 2021–present; revenues subcommittee, 2015–present; finance resources subcommittee, 2017–present; local revenues subcommittee, 2020)

Other memberships
 Maryland Legislative Sportsmen's Caucus, 2015–present
 Maryland Veterans Caucus, 2015–present

Electoral history

References

1957 births
Republican Party members of the Maryland House of Delegates
Living people
21st-century American politicians